Football Club Oswestry Town was a football club based in Oswestry, Shropshire, England. The club played at Park Hall and were affiliated to the Shropshire Football Association.

History
The club was formed in 2013 as a successor to Oswestry Lions, who had folded, and took the Lions' place in Division One of the Mercian Regional League. After finishing third in their first season, they were promoted to the Premier Division. Their first season in the Premier Division saw the club finish fifth, as they also won the Commander Ethelstone Cup. The club went on to win the Premier Division in 2015–16, earning promotion to Division One of the North West Counties League. The season also saw them retain the Commander Ethelstone Cup as well as winning the League Cup and Shropshire Challenge Cup. The 2016-17 season saw the club enter the FA Vase for the first time.

In 2019–20 Oswestry were second in Division One South when the season was abandoned in March due to the COVID-19 pandemic. On 4 July 2020 the club resigned from the North West Counties League and folded due to financial difficulties caused by the pandemic.

Ground
The club played their home games at The Venue, Park Hall, which they shared with The New Saints of the Welsh Premier League.

Honours
Mercian Regional League
Premier Division champions 2015–16
League Cup winners 2015–16
Commander Ethelstone Cup
Winners 2014–15, 2015 16
Shropshire Challenge Cup
Winners 2015–16

Records
Best FA Vase performance: Second qualifying round, 2019–20
Record attendance: 300, Shropshire Challenge Cup, 7 May 2016

References

External links
Official website

Defunct football clubs in England
Defunct football clubs in Shropshire
Association football clubs established in 2013
2013 establishments in England
Mercian Regional Football League
North West Counties Football League clubs
Oswestry
Association football clubs disestablished in 2020
2020 disestablishments in England